|}

The Magnolia Stakes is a Listed flat horse race in Great Britain open to horses aged four years or older. It is run at Kempton Park over a distance of 1 mile 1 furlong and 219 yards (2,011 metres), and it is scheduled to take place each year in late March or early April.
It was switched to Kempton's newly opened all-weather track in 2006.

From 1994 to 2007 the race took place during the Easter weekend.  It is now usually run at a Saturday meeting held either side of Easter, on the same day as the Rosebery Handicap.

Winners since 1987

See also
 Horse racing in Great Britain
 List of British flat horse races

References

 Paris-Turf:

Racing Post

Kempton Park Racecourse
Flat races in Great Britain
Open middle distance horse races
Recurring sporting events established in 1994
1994 establishments in England